Nayden Naydenov (born ) is a former Bulgarian male volleyball player and current coach. He was part of the Bulgaria men's national volleyball team at the 1988 Summer Olympics, the 1994 FIVB Volleyball Men's World Championship and the 1996 Summer Olympics. He is coach of VC Neftochimik 2010 from Bourgas.

See also
VC Marek Union-Ivkoni

References

1967 births
Living people
Bulgarian men's volleyball players
Place of birth missing (living people)
Volleyball players at the 1988 Summer Olympics
Volleyball players at the 1996 Summer Olympics
Olympic volleyball players of Bulgaria